Doğuş Holding A.Ş. (Doğuş Group) is one of the largest private-sector conglomerates in Turkey, with a portfolio of 250 companies in 7 industries, including high-end car dealerships, retail stores, restaurants, cafes, construction companies, radio stations, TV channels and tourism businesses. The group used to own one of Turkey's largest private banks, Garanti, now part of BBVA.

Background
Its foundations were originally laid in 1951 when Ayhan Şahenk made his first investments in the construction sector and transformed Doğuş Construction into a leading builder of Turkish roads, ports and hospitals. Doğuş Construction was founded June 17, 1966, the same year Antur Tourism was founded and Club Alantur in Alanya was acquired. He diversified into banking in the late 1970s. While Turkey evolved from a state-controlled economy toward market capitalism in the 1980s, he branched into importing and joint ventures in automotive, tourism and food, with giants like Volkswagen, Sheraton Hotels and Resorts, and ConAgra.

In 1989 Ayhan Şahenk's son, Ferit Şahenk, returned to Istanbul. His father sent him to apprentice at Garanti Bank (now Garanti BBVA). After eight years, he moved to the holding company and has kept adding pieces. Beginning in 1998 he acquired two food retail chains and operated NTV, funding the expansion by selling part of the group's Garanti Bank to the public. Understanding that top talent is essential to running a diverse group, he also created a recruitment division, Humanitas. In 1999, annual revenue of Doğuş Group hit US$5.7 billion.

In April 2001, Ferit took over Doğuş after his father Ayhan Şahenk died at the age of 72. He relinquished some control of the Garanti Bank, selling a quarter of the country's third largest bank to General Electric for $1.6 billion in 2004, which was regarded as an important step towards greater liberalization in the Turkish banking sector, which had been severely affected by the 2001 economic crisis. He also runs Turkish media properties capturing more than 10 percent of country's advertising market.

Characteristics and structure
The Doğuş Group is active in more than 5 sectors, including finance, automotive, construction, tourism and media.

With over 35,000 employees serving more than 5 million customers, the Group's objective is to use human resources and its superior technological capital to create brand value that will ensure customer loyalty and regional growth through global cooperation.

In 2018, in the course of the Turkish currency and debt crisis, 2018, the group asked its lenders for a debt restructuring. Doğuş’ outstanding loans stood at the equivalent of TRY 23.5 billion (US$5.81 billion) at the end 2017, up 11 percent from the year before. In the wake of the crisis, Doğuş began to sell some assets. In September 2019, the company sold 65% of MB92, the world's leader in refit and maintenance services for superyachts, to Squircle Capital and, in January 2020, CVC Capital Partners agreed to acquire the Greek, Croatian and the UAE businesses of D-Marin, a leading operator of premium yacht marinas in the Mediterranean and United Arab Emirates (UAE) owned by Doğuş.

Projects and interests

Doğuş Group are some of the major financial backers of the İstanbul Modern, alongside the Eczacıbaşı group, and the Nusr-Et steakhouses, made famous by their chef Nusret Gökçe (known for the Internet meme Salt Bae). By 2020, Doğuş Group had planned to construct Galataport, a cruise ship port in Karaköy, Istanbul, in a joint venture with Bilgili Holding.

List of Group Companies

Automotive 
 Doğuş Automotive
Volkswagen
 Audi
 Porsche
 Bentley
 Lamborghini
Bugatti
 SEAT
 Skoda
 Scania
Thermo King
 DOD
 Oto-Fix
 Volkswagen Doğuş Finans
 TÜVTÜRK

Construction 
 Doğuş Construction
 Teknik Engineering and Consultancy

Real estate 
 Doğuş REIT
 Doğuş Real Estate

Tourism 
 D-Hotels & Resorts
 D-Resort Sibenik
 D-Resort Göcek
 Murat Reis Ayvalık
 Grand Hyatt İstanbul
 Maçakızı Bodrum 
 Soho House İstanbul
 Mytha Hotel Anthology
 Aldrovandi Villa Borghese
 Argos In Cappadocia
Villa Dubrovnik
 D-Maris Bay
 Antur Tourism
 D-Saat
 Hublot
 Arnold & Son
 HYT
 Döttling
 Bell & Ross
 Quadran
 Breitling
 Messika
 Vacheron Constantin
 D-Gym
 Körfez Havacılık

Energy 
 D Enerji Üretim ve Yatırım  A.Ş.
 Boyabat Elektrik Üretim ve Ticaret A.Ş.
 Doğuş Enerji Üretim ve Ticaret. A.Ş. (Artvin HES)
 Aslancık Elektrik Üretim A.Ş.
 Doğuş Enerji Toptan Elektrik Ticaret A.Ş.

Media
 Television Channels
 NTV
 Star
 Euro Star 
 Radio Stations
 NTV Radyo
 Kral FM
 Kral Pop Radyo

Food & Beverage 
 D-ream
 Adile Sultan Sarayı Kandilli
 Borsa Restaurant
 Coya Restaurant
 Çubuklu 29
 D.ream Akademi
 Da Mario Ristorante
 Delimonti
 eat.stop
 Fenix İstanbul
 Gina
 Günaydın Et
 Günaydın Handmade Burger
 Günaydın Steak House
 Günaydın Köfte & Döner
 Kebapçı Etiler
 Kitchenette
 Kilimanjaro
 Kiva
 La Petite Maison
 Lacivert Bar & Restaurant
 Masa
 Mezzaluna
 Monochrome
 Nusr.Et Burger
 Nusr.Et Steak House
 Oblix
 Parlé 
 The Populist
 Roka
 Sait
 Sele
 Tom's Kitchen
 Ulus 29
 Vogue
 Zuma
 Rüya
 Dolce
 El Paraguas
 Amazónico
 Ten Con Ten
 Quintin Bar & Restaurante
 Numa Pompilio
 Angie
La Vina
Bar Des Pres

New Investments 
Galataport Port Management and Investments 
DGSK
Doğuş Müşteri Sistemleri
Doğuş Teknoloji
n11.com
Pozitif Live
Reidin
Related Marketing Cloud
TDB Sigorta Brokerlik A.Ş.
TDB Kalibrasyon Hizmetleri A.Ş.
Zingat
Sigortaladim.com

Retail
 Capritouch
 In4Out
 In-Formal
 Loro Piana
 Gucci
 Orlebar Brown
 Under Armour
 Kiko Milano
 Eleventy

Notes

External links
 Doğuş Group Official Website

Conglomerate companies of Turkey
Companies based in Istanbul
Doğuş Group
Holding companies of Turkey
1951 establishments in Turkey
Companies established in 1951